A Kin to Win was a Canadian television game show initially produced in Montreal in 1961, then aired on the CTV network in 1962. Jimmy Tapp was the programme's host.

Production
The series was produced by a Canadian subsidiary of NBC, led by Nick Nicholson and E. Roger Muir. Episodes were recorded in Montreal in the studios of CTV affiliate CFCF-TV at a cost of $2500 apiece.

Premise
Each round of the game consisted of a competition between two families. Fathers of each family acted as team leaders, coaching the other family members. Quiz questions were posed to the players. When answered correctly, they earned a symbol to be added to a square board. A family won after successfully placing four symbols in a row, receiving a designated Prize Chest and proceeding to a bonus prize round known as the Big Plus. The winning family proceeded to a new round, competing against another family.

Broadcast
Initially, the series was broadcast locally in Montreal on CFCF-TV in the early evenings (6:00 p.m.) starting on 2 October 1961. The series was also broadcast on CJSS-TV in Cornwall, Ontario.

Distribution through the full CTV network began from 14 January 1962 and continued until July 1962. Episodes were seen on weekday afternoons at varying times depending on the market (e.g. 1:30 p.m. in Toronto, 4:00 p.m. in Ottawa and Montreal). A weekly Sunday evening episode was also broadcast, typically at 7:30 p.m.

CTV did not renew the series for the 1962-1963 national schedule, although episodes continued to be broadcast locally on CFCF-TV at least until May 1964.

According to Ross Bagwell, an NBC programme developer who worked on A Kin to Win, the series was a forerunner of the American-based game show Family Feud.

Reception
Jeremy Brown, television critic for the Toronto Star, deemed the debut on CTV to be "boring, trite, badly paced, lacking in suspense and incredibly bland."

References

External links
 A Kin to Win at TVArchive

CTV Television Network original programming
1960s Canadian game shows
Television shows filmed in Montreal
Television series by Nicholson-Muir Productions
1961 Canadian television series debuts
1964 Canadian television series endings